Cayn or Ayn is an administrative region that Puntland declared to be founded in the 2000s. However, the administrative division of Somaliland defines it as Buhoodle District in Togdheer, and Somaliland effectively controls it with the exception of Buhoodle district and some other parts. It is bordered by Togdheer to the west, Sool to the east, and Ethiopia to the south. Its capital is Buuhoodle. As an intra-46th meridian east territory, Buuhoodle has a tradition of being external to European colonial rule or convention.

Overview
Centered on the town of Buuhoodle,  Cayn is disputed by Somaliland and Puntland. According to Somaliland, the Cayn area claimed by Puntland is regarded a separate region dubbed Buuhoodle region.

As with much of northern Somalia, most local residents in the Cayn region are nomadic pastoralists.

The region was formerly part of Togdheer region.

Cayn was part of the Las Anod-Nogal District from 1944 with Las Anod as capital until 1974 when the Siad Barre government split the district between the Nugaal and Togdheer regions. John A Hunt stated the following about the Las Anod-Nogal District:

 "The Nogal (Las Anod) District defined in 1944. This was supposed to have been done for administrative convenience, but the somewhat crooked boundary between the Burao and Nogal districts suggests that it was intended to make the Las Anod-Nogal District an entirely Dolbahanta Tribal District ... All the Dolbahanta have been Las Anod District since 1944, except for the Naleya Ahmed of the Ogadyahan Siad ... remaining in Erigavo District".

In Somaliland, the Cayn territory is administrated as part of Togdheer region but it is legally part of Sool region. Article 11, section 1 of the amended Local Government Act which came into force in 2020 provides:

Districts
The Cayn region consists of the following districts:

Buuhoodle District
Widhwidh District
Ceegaag District

Demographics
The Dhulbahante of the Harti Darod clan is well represent in the region.

Major towns
Buuhoodle
Widhwidh
Ceegaag
Horufadhi
Odanleh
Qorilugud

See also
Khatumo State
Sanaag

References

Togdheer
Sool, Somaliland